Caneças is a former civil parish in the municipality of Odivelas, Portugal. In 2013, the parish merged into the new parish Ramada e Caneças. It is a suburb of the Greater Lisbon region.

References

Former parishes of Odivelas